Metaltech may refer to:

Games
 Metaltech, a video game series developed by Dynamix of Sierra, currently owned by Hi-Rez Studios
Metaltech: Battledrome
Metaltech: Earthsiege 
Earthsiege 2
Starsiege

Music
Metaltech (band), a Scottish Electro Rock band